Bamberg County Airport  also known as Tobul Field, is a county-owned public-use airport located  west of the central business district of Bamberg, a city in Bamberg  County, South Carolina, United States. The airport serves the general aviation community, with no scheduled commercial airline service.

Facilities and aircraft

For the 12-month period ending 29 July 2020, the airport had 700 aircraft operations, an average of 2 per day: 100% general aviation, 0% air taxi and 0% military. At that time there were 3 aircraft based at this airport, all single-engine.

See also
List of airports in South Carolina

References

External links

Airports in South Carolina
Buildings and structures in Bamberg County, South Carolina
Transportation in Bamberg County, South Carolina